The Leader of the Bharatiya Janata Party in Parliament is the parliamentary chairperson and representative of the National Executive of the Bharatiya Janata in the Parliament of India.

Lok Sabha Leader  
The Leader of the Bharaitya Janata Party in the Lok Sabha, is the chief spokesperson and parliamentary head of the Bharatiya Janata Party in the House. If the BJP forms the majority, the leader is usually elected as prime minister and leader of the House.

Rajya Sabha Leader

See also
List of presidents of the Bharatiya Janata Party
Leader of the House (Lok Sabha)
Leader of the House (Rajya Sabha)
Leader of the Opposition (India)
Leader of the Indian National Congress in the Parliament of India

References

Bharatiya Janata Party politicians
leaders of the Bharatiya Janata Party in Parliament